Podmilačje is a village in the municipality of Jajce, Bosnia and Herzegovina.

In the village the shrine of Saint John the Baptist is situated since 15th century.

Demographics 
According to the 2013 census, its population was 430.

References

Populated places in Jajce